Roland I de Vaux, Lord of Triermain and Tercrosset, was a prominent 12th-century English noble.

Biography
Vaux was the illegitimate son of Ranulf de Vaux, Lord of Triermain and Tercrosset, who later succeeded as Baron of Gilsland. Roland was granted the lands of Triermain and Tercrosset by his father and those lands were confirmed by his brother Robert. He was a hostage for his brother's Robert debts with King John of England in 1212. Roland was succeeded by his son Alexander.

Citations

References
 
 

12th-century English people
Roland